Phil Brooks (11 October 1901 – 19 August 1963) was an Australian rules footballer who played with South Melbourne and Hawthorn in the Victorian Football League (VFL).

Notes

External links 

1901 births
1963 deaths
Australian rules footballers from Melbourne
Sydney Swans players
Hawthorn Football Club players
People from South Melbourne